Ruth Halbsguth (9 December 1916 – 12 October 2003) was a German swimmer who competed in the 1936 Summer Olympics. She was born in Eckernförde.

In the 1936 Olympics she won a silver medal in the Women's 4 × 100 metre freestyle relay event.

References

External links
profile

1916 births
2003 deaths
People from Eckernförde
German female swimmers
Olympic swimmers of Germany
Swimmers at the 1936 Summer Olympics
Olympic silver medalists for Germany
German female freestyle swimmers
European Aquatics Championships medalists in swimming
Medalists at the 1936 Summer Olympics
Olympic silver medalists in swimming
Sportspeople from Schleswig-Holstein